Tykadłów  is a village in the administrative district of Gmina Żelazków, within Kalisz County, Greater Poland Voivodeship, in west-central Poland. Olympian Stanisław Marucha was born here.

References

Villages in Kalisz County